Ocean Isle Beach (Ocean Isle) is a small seaside town in Brunswick County, North Carolina, United States.  It was incorporated as a town in 1959 and is part of the Myrtle Beach metropolitan area. The population was 550 at the 2010 census.

Located at the southern end of North Carolina's Atlantic coastline, along the Atlantic Intracoastal Waterway, Ocean Isle Beach has private homes, seasonal rentals, and various tourist attractions.

Geography
Ocean Isle Beach is located in southwest Brunswick County at  (33.894558, -78.438895). The town spans the barrier island of Ocean Isle Beach, extending  from Tubbs Inlet on the west to Shallotte Inlet on the east, and a section of the mainland to the north along North Carolina Highway 904.

Known as the "Gem of the Brunswick Islands", Ocean Isle Beach is located along the coastal corridor between Wilmington, North Carolina and Myrtle Beach, South Carolina. Ocean Isle Beach is connected to the mainland by a modern bridge spanning marsh savannas. The beach runs east to west and offers a fishing pier, public boat launch facility, direct access to the Intracoastal Waterway, and beach paths every .  The Museum of Coastal Carolina offers dioramas on coastal life, a touch tank, a collection of Civil War and Native American artifacts, and a variety of interactive exhibits. The museum's sister facility, located in nearby Sunset Beach, Ingram Planetarium, offers an 85-seat domed theater with learning experiences on astronomy, energy, navigation, and space exploration.

Ocean Isle Beach is finalizing details for a new roundabout that will be located at HWY 179. This design will include a brick retaining wall with "Welcome to Ocean Isle Beach" along with three bronze statues of children playing with kites. According to the media reports, the construction of the new town hall located at 111 Causeway Drive is officially underway and it will expect to be completed in June.

In June 22 of 2021 the statues were fully completed. Due to a car collision, two of the statues were destroyed and the roundabout was also hit. Damage to the roundabout has been repaired, along with one of the statues, but now only 2 of the 3 statues remain. No injuries have been reported.

Demographics

2020 census

As of the 2020 United States census, there were 867 people, 374 households, and 289 families residing in the town.

2000 census
As of the census of 2000, there were 426 people, 209 households, and 141 families residing in the town. The population density was 124.2 people per square mile (48.0/km). There were 2,507 housing units at an average density of 731.0 per square mile (282.2/km). The racial makeup of the town was 98.59% White, 0.94% Native American and 0.47% Asian. Hispanic or Latino of any race were 0.47% of the population.

There were 209 households, out of which 11.5% had children under the age of 18 living with them, 62.7% were married couples living together, 2.4% had a female householder with no husband present, and 32.5% were non-families. 25.4% of all households were made up of individuals, and 5.3% had someone living alone who was 65 years of age or older. The average household size was 2.04 and the average family size was 2.40.

In the town, the population was spread out, with 10.3% under the age of 18, 5.4% from 18 to 24, 17.8% from 25 to 44, 45.3% from 45 to 64, and 21.1% who were 65 years of age or older. The median age was 53 years. For every 100 females, there were 99.1 males. For every 100 females age 18 and over, there were 97.9 males.

The median income for a household in the town was $67,639, and the median income for a family was $65,625. Males had a median income of $37,188 versus $22,188 for females. The per capita income for the town was $42,605. About 3.5% of families and 4.1% of the population were below the poverty line, including none of those under age 18 and 5.9% of those age 65 or over.

Common animals & weather 
Ocean Isle Beach is home to many animals. Some of them being deer, foxes, and Sea turtles. The deer cross the marshes during low-tide and feed on the plants, while the foxes live on the island. The foxes have been commonly found during the night in all seasons and have been seen eating scraps of food found in trash cans. The frogs and toads are found near the western side of the island, with Toads coming out during the Summertime. Copperheads and Moccasins also breed during the Fall, but incidents with them are rare.

For birds, Boat-Tailed Grackles, Doves, and Laughing Gulls are the most common. For sanitary reasons some houses on the island have started to put up owl statues and ribbons to scare away the birds. Cranes are also found in the marshy sound during low-tide.

Weather in Ocean Isle tends to be warm but varied, with the temperature averaging around 88F (31C) during the Summer of 2021, and 58F (14C) during the Winter of 2020. Rainfall is normal during the end of the Summer, and lightning storms are frequent. Hurricanes are also common and have been known to cause fires.

Local myths 
A popular myth in Ocean Isle beach are the mysterious lights which floats over the ocean during the nighttime. It is unknown whether it is a drone, stars, or fishing boats. The anomaly has been reported to split apart into multiple lights before joining back together. After 5–10 minutes the lights disappear.

Sightings of the lights have increased in 2021, with some accounts claiming that they are alien UFOs.

The story of "first street" is also relatively popular in Ocean Isle. One of the eastern streets of Ocean Isle was, at one point, flooded and is now engulfed underwater. Pieces of the remaining asphalt from the street have washed up on the beaches. To defend against future flooding, sandbags have been installed under the stilted houses on "second street" and the beaches have been manually expanded. As of 2022, the beaches on the east side of the island have been heavily cleaned and restored.

Parks & recreation 

Brunswick County has completed a new  recreational park on the mainland. The park offers a variety of amenities, such as an amphitheater, festival grounds, ball parks, lighted tennis courts, and biking trails. This recreational park is located on Old Georgetown Road and is part of a $500,000 federal grant for parks throughout the county. Other projects scheduled is the Shallotte Blvd Recreation Area, which is a joint project between Ocean Isle Beach Land Conservancy and the Town of Ocean Isle Beach. The park will be at Shallotte Blvd and the ferry landing at the East end of the island. The recreation area will have a gazebo, picnic tables, a fishing pier, and a walkway with steps to the sand.

On the island of Ocean Isle Beach the town has recently finished a community area with an amphitheater, playground, small water area and bathrooms. Likewise. a children's play area and public gazebo are located on the eastern end of the island adjacent to the Intracoastal Waterway, along with a concert stage. The Town of Ocean Isle is also about to finish a new town Hall with administration office next to the Fires station.

Best Restored Beach Award 
The American Shore and Beach Preservation Association named Ocean Isle Beach the winner of its 2008 Best Restored Beach Award. Ocean Isle Beach's quest for a federal beach restoration program began after Hurricane Hugo devastated the area in 1989. The town lobbied members of Congress for federal funding and opened a capital reserve savings account to provide the local share of funding necessary for restoration. Coastal engineers began the project in 2001 and provided high-quality sand for the beach and created a deeper channel for boaters. Judging for the award was based on three criteria: the economic and ecological benefits the beach brings to its community; the short and long-term success of the restoration project; and the challenges each community overcame during the course of the project.

Extreme weather 
In 1989, Hurricane Hugo devastated the area.
 
In 2020, Hurricane Isaias made landfall near Ocean Isle Beach, as high end Category 1, causing significant damage to waterfront properties and the fishing pier.

References

External links

 Town of Ocean Isle Beach official website
 Ocean Isle Beach commercial website
 Ocean Isle Beach information website
  Ocean Isle Beach Insider Info Area Guide
 Ocean Isle Beach Turtle Patrol, a volunteer program protecting nesting Loggerhead sea turtles.
 Ocean Isle Beach Beachcam
 Ocean Isle Beach Land Conservancy
 Ocean Isle Beach Airport
 Ocean Isle Beach Real Estate Information
 

Towns in Brunswick County, North Carolina
Towns in North Carolina
Beaches of North Carolina
Cape Fear (region)
Barrier islands of North Carolina
Landforms of Brunswick County, North Carolina
Populated coastal places in North Carolina